At midday on December 13, 2009, Steven Koecher (born November 1, 1979) got out of his car and parked at the end of a cul-de-sac in the Anthem neighborhood of Henderson, Nevada, United States, an action recorded on a nearby home's security camera. After returning shortly afterwards, he retrieved something from the vehicle and walked away, with another security camera capturing his reflection in a car window. Koecher has not been seen since, although some activity was recorded on his cell phone over the next two days.

Koecher's absence from his home, work, and church activities in St. George, Utah, was not noted for several days; eventually, the homeowners' association of Anthem, where he had parked, got in touch with his employer and then his parents about the abandoned car, at which time he was reported missing. Police had few leads at first, since it appeared he had intended to return to Utah and did not appear to be involved in any criminal activities. The reason for his trip to the Las Vegas area that day has never been determined; his family believes he was looking for work since he could not make the full rent payments on his apartment with the job he had. Searches in the area around where he was last seen yielded no evidence.

Further investigation found credit card and cell phone receipts and witness statements showing that in the week prior to his disappearance, Koecher had been driving great distances around Utah and Nevada, including almost  in one day. The purpose of these trips is also unknown; on one he stopped to visit a former girlfriend's parents and had lunch at their house.

Joshua Powell, a West Valley City man suspected of murder in the disappearance of his wife Susan Powell  which took place a week before Koecher's  argued along with his father and brother that the two cases were related, suggesting the two were romantically involved and had run off together. Both Susan's family and Koecher's have dismissed that theory. The Koecher case has been the subject of an episode of the Investigation Discovery channel's Disappeared series.

Background

Steven Koecher was born in 1979 in Amarillo, Texas, one of four children of Rolf and Deanne Koecher. He was active in the Boy Scouts, eventually making Eagle Scout. After graduating from Amarillo High School in 1998, Koecher, a devout Latter-day Saint, attended first Ricks College (now Brigham Young University–Idaho) and later the University of Utah, where he received a degree in communications. He performed missionary work in Brazil and learned to speak Portuguese.

After college, Koecher interned in the office of the governor of Utah for nine months. A year and a half later, he went to work for the Davis County Clipper, a Bountiful-based bi-weekly newspaper edited by his father, as a stringer. Koecher remained there for another year and a half, with some articles he worked on receiving awards from the Utah Press Association.

In 2007, Koecher began working for the Salt Lake Tribunes digital advertising division. He liked the work, according to his mother, but not working the overnight shift. The many temperature inversions in the Salt Lake City area that winter also bothered him, so after a year he decided to leave his job at the Tribune and relocate to St. George, in the warmer southwestern portion of the state.

Koecher initially worked with another Internet advertising firm, Matchbin, but that employment ended soon after he relocated. With the Great Recession underway, it was difficult for him to find a new job. Koecher was able to find some work handing out flyers for a local window-washing firm. It did not provide him with enough income to meet his expenses, and by November 2009 he was several months behind on his rent. Greg Webb, the singles' ward president, claims the local electric utility was threatening to terminate Koecher's service for nonpayment, although his mother says that would have been the landlord's responsibility. Because of this, Koecher was actively seeking another job, using connections from the local ward where he volunteered.

December 10–12, 2009

He then traveled west on Interstate 80 another  to West Wendover, Nevada, where he again pulled off the highway to refuel. After that he continued another  to the Ruby Valley ranch of the Neff family.

Koecher had in the past dated Annemarie Neff and visited the ranch; he told her parents, who had not been expecting him, that he thought he would stop in to see her. She was not there, but the Neffs served Koecher lunch anyway. He told them he was on his way to visit family in Sacramento, California, but was not certain whether he could continue in that direction due to bad weather. After two hours he left, and decided to return to St. George the way he had come, stopping to buy gas again in Salt Lake City and Springville, followed by dinner at a Taco Time in Nephi.

During the day Koecher talked with his mother on the phone. The two discussed his plans for returning to the family's home in Bountiful for Christmas. Koecher's mother said he seemed upbeat about the upcoming holiday and his job prospects despite his financial difficulties. He did not tell her of his road trip that day.

The next day, while handing out flyers for his employer, Koecher encountered two young girls who had inadvertently been locked out of their family's apartment. Learning of their plight, he tried to call their mother. When she did not answer, he looked for someone in the neighborhood who could take them in temporarily until someone arrived who could let them in. That same day, Koecher spoke with his ward's bishop, who also described Koecher's mood as positive. The bishop was also trying to help him, and had promised Koecher he would have a job available by the beginning of 2010.

On December 12, Koecher again hit the road. That morning his phone pinged a cell tower near Overton, Nevada, at the north end of Lake Mead. In the evening he bought gas and snacks at a convenience store in Mesquite, Nevada, along I-15, just over the Arizona state line. Why Koecher went to Nevada that day is unknown; three hours after his Mesquite purchase, Koecher bought a baby's bib and cookies, believed to be Christmas gifts for his brother and his family, whose names he had drawn in the family's annual Christmas gift exchange, at a Kmart outside St. George.

Disappearance

A neighbor of Koecher's recalled seeing him return to his apartment around 10 p.m. A half-hour later, he left again; while he was not seen to return later that night it was possible he could have. The next morning, December 13, Webb called Koecher, saying he was on his way back from Las Vegas and feared he might not make it to St. George in time for the 11 a.m. service, asking if Koecher could lead it in his absence. Webb told him not to worry and that he would try to get back in time. Another ward member called again later that morning with a similar request, which they dropped when Koecher told them where he was. Neither he nor Webb asked Koecher why he had gone to the Las Vegas area that morning; they found nothing unusual about their conversations with him.

At 11:54 a.m., a home security camera on Savannah Springs Avenue in Sun City, a retirement community in the Anthem development in southern Henderson, recorded Koecher's car driving into the cul-de-sac where it was later found. Six minutes later, a figure believed by his family to be Koecher, wearing a white shirt and slacks, walked the opposite direction down the sidewalk in front, carrying something in one hand that appeared to be a file folder or portfolio. Shortly afterwards another security camera in a garage on adjacent Evening Lights Street caught his reflection as he walked north. Koecher has not been seen since.

Koecher's phone remained active. Two hours after that, it pinged another tower near Henderson's Whitney Ranch subdivision, two miles (3.2 km) north of the previous ping. Early the next morning, the phone pinged a tower at the interchange between Interstate 515/U.S. Route 93 and Russell Road, two more miles to the north. Koecher's landlord sent a text, and then an hour later it was used to check Koecher's voicemail. The phone remained in that tower's vicinity for the next two days, suggesting that its battery died. There has been no activity since.

A day after that last ping, Sun City's homeowners' association parking enforcement took note of the car at the end of the Savannah Springs cul-de-sac and tried to find its owner. Through the windows they saw one of the flyers Koecher had been distributing for the window-washing company in St. George and called the number on it. Eventually they spoke with the owner, who gave them Koecher's cell phone number, where they left a voicemail. Later they called his mother; she returned their call on December 17, and, realizing no one else in the family had talked to him in a week and were unable to locate him, reported him missing. Koecher's brother and sister drove to St. George from the Salt Lake City area to start searching.

Investigations

The Koecher family went to jails, morgues, and hospitals in the Las Vegas area in search of Steven Koecher. At one point, when employees at an International House of Pancakes told them that a man fitting Koecher's description had eaten there for three weeks straight, they themselves ate there for four nights. Another employee eventually gave them a more detailed description of the man and his eating habits, which led the Koechers to conclude he was not Steven.

The Las Vegas Metropolitan Police (LVMPD) canvassed the houses in the neighborhood where Koecher's car had been parked. With the help of volunteers, they used helicopters, all terrain vehicles, and sniffer dogs. By Christmas, the media in Salt Lake City and Las Vegas had begun reporting the story. A local dairy put Koecher's picture on a milk carton, and the LVMPD put a video with information on the case on its YouTube channel.

In April 2010, another party of searchers scoured the open desert south of the Henderson Executive Airport to the west of where Koecher had parked in response to a tip passed along to a former LVMPD officer working as a private investigator for the family. A group of 70 covered about a half-mile (1 km) stretch in two hours. Bone fragments were found, but they were not human.

Rolf Koecher, Steven's father, died in February 2011 after a brief illness that may have been toxic shock syndrome. Rolf had, with his wife and family, recently finished filming an episode of the Investigation Discovery cable channel's show Disappeared about Steven's case. It aired two months later.

A cousin of the Koechers started a Facebook page devoted to the case. It generated not only some tips but suggestions for how to investigate further. Members of the WebSleuths Internet forum also took up the case; they assembled a timeline of events based on newspaper accounts and social media posts by Koecher's family and friends.

In 2015, a local search and rescue group organized another effort, this time going high up the hills south of Anthem, on a different theory of what Koecher might have been doing. They did not find anything.

Theories

Koecher's family believes, given his financial circumstances at the time, that he had gone to Henderson that morning for a job opportunity. Despite the odd location where he parked his car, on the video the neatly dressed Koecher is walking purposefully, suggesting he knew where he was going and what he was going there for. "He doesn't look confused or dazed", Steven's brother Dallin said in 2018.

But beyond that, there is no evidence to suggest what happened afterwards, nor has anything emerged subsequently which could. "We know about as much now as we did the second we realized he was gone," the St. George police detective in charge of the case said in 2018. Koecher's difficulties notwithstanding, his family does not believe he chose to voluntarily disappear in order to escape them, or take his own life. His mother said that in her last conversation with him, on December 10, he was optimistic about his ability to find another job and the two were making plans for his Christmas visit home.

Koecher's car and its contents also suggest he intended to return to St. George. His father said that the car was in working order and the gas tank was half full when he reached it on December 17, after his wife was contacted by the Sun City parking authority. In the car were the Christmas presents Steven had bought for his brother and his family at a Kmart department store the previous day, as well as job applications and the flyers from his employer that had helped the parking authority find his parents. At Koecher's apartment, his clothing and possessions remained where he stored them and had not been disturbed or packed.

Koecher's unusual, and mostly unexplained, travel in the days leading up to his disappearance has led to suppositions that he may have turned to some sort of illicit activity for income. A drug dog was taken to sniff over his car but did not alert on anything. Another vehicle seen on the security camera footage driving up and down the street around the time Koecher parked and walked away from his car was investigated, and turned out to be a local real estate agent showing a house in the area.

Checks of Koecher's financial history and phone records turned up nothing unusual aside from the trips. A single charge to his credit card since the disappearance was just an automatic charge made to webhosting company GoDaddy ensuing from his days at Matchbin. One unknown phone number turned out to be the family of the two girls Koecher had been helping get back inside on the day before he went to Las Vegas.

A search of Koecher's computer and Internet browsing history found nothing unusual. Investigators also checked his borrowing history at the St. George library and found nothing there that suggested any unexplored leads. Koecher kept a diary, but recorded no problems in his life at the time of his disappearance beyond his monetary issues and his ongoing bachelorhood, neither of which he believed would last much longer.

The family does not consider Koecher's travel to be particularly unusual, either. One of his reasons for moving to St. George was to research family history in that area; he often went on tours of cemeteries looking for ancestors' graves. Koecher's mother believes the trips were just his way of keeping himself busy despite his underemployment.

While there is no evidence that would suggest Koecher was murdered or kidnapped, neither the St. George nor Henderson police have found any evidence to eliminate that possibility. "There's nothing that makes us suspicious," Detective Adam Olmstead of the St. George police told the Las Vegas Review-Journal. "But at the same time, it's a strange situation."

Theorized connection to Susan Powell disappearance

Koecher disappeared a week after Susan Powell was reported missing from her home in the Salt Lake City suburb of West Valley City. The latter case received much more media attention as suspicion centered on her husband, Joshua, with whom she had been having marital difficulties. The night after a neighbor last saw her in the family home, Joshua had left after midnight to take the couple's two sons camping in Tooele County. Police officers who came to investigate the next morning after Susan did not drop her sons off at daycare forced entry into the house and found two box fans blowing at a wet spot on the couch.

Early in the Koecher investigation, tips were posted to the Internet and brought to the family's attention suggesting a connection between the two disappearances. In 2010, Joshua's family began making those allegations publicly, claiming on a website they had set up to find Susan that she had, with her family's help, framed her husband for murder and eloped with Koecher. Steven Powell, Joshua's father, outlined the theory in a February letter to police and FBI agents investigating his daughter-in-law's case.

Police investigated the connection, but found nothing to support it. A Koecher family friend, who by 2011 had taken over managing the Facebook page on Koecher, called the allegations "nonsense". Joshua Powell moved to Washington, where he died along with his sons in a 2012 murder-suicide; his father Steven, who had been convicted of child pornography and voyeurism after, among other things, explicit pictures he had secretly taken of Susan were found on his computer, died in 2018, a year after finishing his sentence.

See also

List of people who disappeared
List of Disappeared episodes

Other missing people who were last seen alone by security cameras
Rebecca Coriam
Andrew Gosden
Lars Mittank
Sneha Anne Philip
Brian Shaffer

Notes

References

External links

 
Case timeline compiled by WebSleuths
Help Us Find Steven Koecher Community Page on Facebook
Steven Koecher (Discussion) Group on Facebook

2000s missing person cases
Missing person cases in Nevada
History of Henderson, Nevada
2009 in Nevada
December 2009 events in the United States